Town and country planning in Wales is based on the land use planning system which applies in England. However, the system in Wales has some distinctive features which have arisen because substantial responsibility for town and country planning has been devolved to the Welsh Government (WAG). In particular, Wales now has a Spatial Plan and Welsh Ministers have a duty to under the Government of Wales Act 2006 to promote sustainable development.

Overall planning policy in Wales

The context for planning policy in Wales is contained within two main documents, Planning Policy Wales, which provides guidance on the preparation and content of development plans and advice on development control decisions and appeals; and Minerals Planning Policy Wales, which gives guidance for the extraction of all minerals and other substances in, on or under land.  Taken together with supporting documents, these cover the same broad areas as Planning Policy Statements in England.

They are supplemented by a series of topic-based Technical Advice Notes (TANs) and Minerals Technical Advice Notes (MTANs). Changes or updates to planning policy are issued in Ministerial Interim Planning Policy Statements (MIPPs). Circular letters provide advice and guidance on specific topics.

Wales Spatial Plan

The Wales Spatial Plan  was published by the Welsh Assembly in 2004.  The Plan is in some respects similar to a Regional Spatial Strategy in England, but is less prescriptive and broader than land use planning, setting out a wider-ranging spatial vision and strategy:
Provide a clear framework for future collaborative action involving the Welsh Assembly Government and its agencies, local authorities, the private and voluntary sectors to achieve the priorities it sets out nationally and regionally
Influence the location of expenditure by the Assembly Government and its agencies
Influence the mix and balance of public sector delivery agencies’ programmes in different areas
Set the context for local and community planning
Provide a clear evidence base for the public, private and voluntary sectors develop policy and action

An update to the Wales Spatial Plan, People, Places, Futures, was published for consultation in early 2008.  It sets a vision for how each part of Wales should develop economically, socially and environmentally over the next 20 years and will guide the way the Government spends its money over the coming years.

There are six spatial plan areas to represent regional perspectives in Wales.  Each area group is chaired by a cabinet minister.  The areas are:
Central Wales
North East Wales - Border and Coast
North West Wales – Eryri a Môn 
Pembrokeshire – The Haven
South East Wales – Capital Network
Swansea Bay – Waterfront and Western Valleys

Local Development Plans

Following the Planning and Compulsory Purchase Act 2004, each unitary authority in Wales is required to prepare a local development plan (LDP) for its area. These will replace the previous unitary development plans (UDPs), and will become the sole development plans for each council and National Park. Authorities in Wales must have regard to WAG planning policy documents, including the Wales Spatial Plan, in preparing LDPs.  Unlike the LDF arrangement in England, the LDP will be a single document, setting out strategy as well as site-specific and development control policies.

Development control

Development control is the process of administering and making decisions on planning applications, to develop or change the use of land or buildings. The basis for decisions on planning applications is usually the adopted development plan.

References

External links
 Welsh Government
 Planning Portal for England and Wales
 Planning Inspectorate Wales
Royal Town Planning Institute in Wales
Planning Aid Wales

 
United Kingdom planning policy